Frank Fleming (born July 25, 1959) is an American stock car racing driver. Fleming previously competed in the NASCAR Busch Series and the NASCAR Southern Modified Tour. Currently, he competes in the NASCAR Whelen Modified Tour.

Fleming competed in 10 NASCAR Busch Series races between 1988 and 1991. During the 1990 season, Fleming's crew chief was former NASCAR driver Chip Lain. His best career Busch Series finish was a 20th at Daytona International Speedway in 1990.

Fleming competed in a total of 106 NASCAR Southern Modified Tour races between 2005 and 2015. During this span, Fleming achieved 66 top tens, 1 pole position, and 1 win.

Between 1986 and 2019, Fleming competed in a total of 33 NASCAR Whelen Modified Tour races. He has 4 top tens.

Motorsports career results

NASCAR
(key) (Bold – Pole position awarded by qualifying time. Italics – Pole position earned by points standings or practice time. * – Most laps led.)

Busch Series

References

External links
 

1959 births
Living people
NASCAR drivers
People from Mount Airy, North Carolina
Racing drivers from North Carolina